Hadenoecini is a tribe of cave crickets in the family Rhaphidophoridae. There are two genera and nine described species. It is sometimes considered a synonym of the subfamily Dolichopodainae.

They are pale and spider-like, occurring in forests and caves in the eastern United States. They are sometimes referred to as white cave-crickets.

Genera
Two genera are included in the tribe Hadenoecini.
 Euhadenoecus Hubbell, 1978
 Hadenoecus Scudder, 1863

References

Rhaphidophoridae
Orthoptera tribes
Articles created by Qbugbot